Letty Lou Eisenhauer (born 1935) was an American visual and performance artist known for her free-spirited Fluxus performances during the 1960s.  She is now on faculty at the Borough of Manhattan Community College as a counselor, professor, and forensic psychologist.

Biography
Eisenhauer was an undergraduate at Douglass College from 1953-1957 and was a graduate student and department secretary in the M.F.A. program from 1961 to 1962. She studied art primarily with Robert Watts. She befriended Geoff Hendricks and Roy Lichtenstein, both of whom were teaching art at Douglass College at the time.

Watts introduced her to Allan Kaprow, who persuaded her to perform in his Spring Happening, her first performance. She continued to perform in Happenings throughout the 1960s, often appearing nude or scantily clad. She simultaneously pursued a career in the visual arts, exhibiting sculptures, prints, and paintings, many of which were informed by a Pop sensibility.

She has established an artists' residence, in Lehigh Valley, Pennsylvania.

Selected performances
Spring Happening, by Kaprow. Performed at the Reuben Gallery.
Courtyard, by Kaprow. Performed at the Greenwich (or Mills) Hotel on Bleecker Street in November, 1962.
The First and Second Wilderness, by Michael Kirby. Performed during the Yam Festival, at Smolin Gallery, NYC, May 27, 1963. Letty Eisenhauer wrote cheers and performed them as a cheerleader for a Civil War-inspired live action board game.
BLINK, Rolf Nelson Gallery, Los Angeles in 1963. Eisenhauer modeled collaborative creations by Alison Knowles, George Brecht, and Watts.
Whipped Cream Piece (Lick Piece), by Ben Patterson. Performed during Fully Guaranteed 12 Fluxus Concerts at Fluxhall in 1964 in New York City.
Orange, by Kaprow. Performed in 1964.
Tart, or Miss America, by Dick Higgins, 1965, Queens boxing arena. This piece was dedicated to Eisenhauer who also performed in it.
Washes, by Claes Oldenburg, May 1965. In this piece Eisenhauer, covered with balloons, floated motionless on her back in a swimming pool, while a man bit the balloons and exploded them.

References

Bibliography

Sid Sachs and Kalliopi Minioudaki, Seductive Subversion: Women Pop Artists, 1958-1968. Philadelphia, PA: University of the Arts, Philadelphia, 2010.
 Cheryl Harper, A Happening Place. Philadelphia: The Jewish Community Centers of Greater Philadelphia, 2003.
 David McCabe, A Year in the Life of Andy Warhol. New York: Phaidon, 2003.
 John Marter, ed. Off Limits: Rutgers University and the Avant-Garde, 1957-1963. New Brunswick, NJ and London: The Newark Museum, Newark, NJ and Rutgers University Press, 1999.
 Jon Hendricks, Fluxus Codex. New York: Harry N. Abrams, 1988.
 Dick Higgins, "The Tart, or Miss America," in TDR (Tulane Drama Review), ed. Richard Schechner and Michael Kirby (special issue eds.), 10, no. 2 (Winter 1965): 132–141.

1935 births
Living people
American women performance artists
American performance artists
20th-century American artists
20th-century American women artists
Fluxus
Rutgers University alumni
21st-century American women